Robert R. Dougherty (born August 9, 1969) is a professional Magic: The Gathering player from Framingham, Massachusetts. He was inducted to the Magic Hall of Fame in November 2006. He is also a tournament organizer and the founder of Your Move Games. Your Move Games is the name of one of the most respected teams in the history of the game as well as the name of a chain of game stores owned by Dougherty.

Rob is also a game designer and the CEO of Wise Wizard Games. Their deckbuilding game Star Realms has won numerous awards, including the 2015 SXSW Tabletop Game of the Year Award, four Golden Geek Awards for Best 2-Player Game, Best Card Game, Best Indie Game and Best Handheld Game, two Dice Tower Awards for Best Two-Player Game and Best Small Publisher, and Best Card Game: Fan Favorite at Origins 2015.  He has designed Epic Card Game, the EpicTCG and Battleground Fantasy Warfare. He has also worked on Hero Realms, Ascension: Chronicle of the Godslayer, Solforge, and the VS Trading Card Game.

Accomplishments 

Other accomplishments:
 Magic Hall of Fame class of 2006
 Top 4 at Pro Circuit-Indianapolis (2005) (VS System)

References

External links 
 White Wizard Games website
 Star Realms website
 Epic Card Game website
 Hero Realms website

Living people
American Magic: The Gathering players
People from Framingham, Massachusetts
1969 births